Alyogyne is a  genus of  flowering plants in the family Malvaceae which are endemic to Australia. Its species were formerly in the genus Hibiscus but were split off starting in 1863 with H. hakaeifolius. In 1915 Lewton transferred H. cuneiformis and in Fryxell (1968) H. pinonianus and H. huegelii followed. A recent revision has created many new species.

The name Alyogyne comes from the Greek words "alytos" (undivided) and "gyne" (female). "Gyne" referers to the styles which are female parts of a flower. In Hibiscus, the style is branched below the stigmas but in Alyogyne it is undivided.

Species include:

Alyogyne cravenii
Alyogyne cuneiformis (coastal hibiscus)
Alyogyne hakeifolia 
Alyogyne huegelii (lilac hibiscus)
Alyogyne pinoniana (sand hibiscus)

References
 Malvaceae Info: The Alyogyne Page

External links
 
 FloraBase - the Western Australian Flora: Alyogyne

Gossypieae
Malvales of Australia
Malvaceae genera
Taxa named by Friedrich Alefeld